The Mott–Schottky equation relates the capacitance to the applied voltage across a semiconductor-electrolyte junction.

This theory predicts that a Mott–Schottky plot will be linear.  The doping density  can be derived from the slope of the plot (provided the area and dielectric constant are known).  The flatband potential can be determined as well; absent the temperature term, the plot would cross the -axis at the flatband potential.

Derivation
Under an applied potential , the width of the depletion region is

Thus, the differential capacitance is

which is equivalent to the Mott-Schottky equation, save for the temperature term.  In fact the temperature term arises from a more careful analysis, which takes statistical mechanics into account by abandoning the abrupt approximation and solving the Poisson–Boltzmann equation for the charge density in the depletion region.

References

Equations